is a shopping complex in central Tokyo built in 2005, in a series of urban developments by Mori Building. It occupies a two hundred and fifty meter stretch of Omotesandō, a shopping and (previously) residential road in Aoyama. It was designed by Tadao Ando, and contains over 130 shops and 38 apartments.

The construction of Omotesando Hills, built at a cost of $330 million, has been marked by controversy. The building replaced the Bauhaus-inspired Dōjunkai Aoyama Apartments, which had been built in 1927 after the 1923 Kantō earthquake. The destruction of the apartments again raised questions about Japan's interest in preserving historic buildings. A small section of the old apartments is reconstructed in the South-East part of the new complex.

Minoru Mori noted that there had been resistance from local landowners to the use of Ando as architect, saying that they were concerned that his buildings were too fashionable for the area.

Regarding the construction, Ando said, "It's not Tadao Ando as an architect who has decided to rebuild and make shops, it was the owners themselves who wanted it to be new housing and to get some value with shops below. My task was how to do it in the best way.”

References

External links

 

Shopping centres in Japan
Buildings and structures in Shibuya
Tadao Ando buildings
Shopping malls established in 2005
Harajuku
Mori Building
2005 establishments in Japan